Sachin INA is a town and an industrial notified area in Surat district in the Indian state of Gujarat.

Demographics
 India census, Sachin INA had a population of 13293. Males constitute 86% of the population and females 14%. Sachin INA has an average literacy rate of 79%, higher than the national average of 59.5%: male literacy is 84%, and female literacy is 45%. In Sachin INA, 6% of the population is under 6 years of age.

See also 
List of tourist attractions in Surat

References

Suburban area of Surat
Cities and towns in Surat district